Monte-Carlo Riviera (MCR) is a planned state-owned television station in Monaco scheduled to launch between June and September of 2023. It will broadcast a range of programmes, including news, talk shows, and documentaries, designed to showcase and promote Monegasque culture. MCRTV was originally planned to launch in late 2022 however, in April 2022, it was announced that the channel's launch had been delayed to the third quarter of 2023.

The channel, which will be funded in part by both the state and through advertising, will become a member of TV5Monde, allowing its content to be broadcast in 200 countries.

References 

Television in Monaco
French-language television stations
Television channels and stations established in 2023